The 2014 Campeonato Paraense Finals was the final that decided the 2014 Campeonato Paraense, the 102nd season of the Campeonato Paraense. The final were contested between Paysandu and Remo. 

Remo defeated Paysandu 4–3 on aggregate to win their 43rd Campeonato Paraense title.

Teams

Format
The finals were played on a home-and-away two-legged basis. If tied on aggregate, the penalty shoot-out was used to determine the winner.

Matches

First leg

Second leg

{| width="100%"
|valign="top" width="40%"|

See also
2015 Copa Verde
2015 Copa do Brasil

References

Campeonato Paraense Finals